René Dorin (13 November 1891, La Rochelle – 25 July 1969, Noisy-le-Grand) was a 20th-century French chansonnier, screenwriter and playwright.
René Dorin was the father of writer André Dorin and comedian, writer and playwright Françoise Dorin.

Theatre 
1939: Mailloche by René Dorin, Théâtre de la Madeleine

Cinema 
1932: En lisant le journal, short film by Alberto Cavalcanti (actor and screenwriter)
1934: Quatre à Troyes, by Pierre-Jean Ducis (actor and screenwriter)
1934: Les Géants de la route, by Pierre-Jean Ducis (actor and screenwriter)
1940: Radio Surprises, by Marcel Aboulker (actor, as himself)

References

External links 

French chansonniers
French male actors
French male screenwriters
20th-century French screenwriters
20th-century French dramatists and playwrights
1891 births
1969 deaths
People from La Rochelle
Burials at Batignolles Cemetery
20th-century French  male singers
20th-century French male writers